ORP Krakowiak was a British Type II Hunt-class destroyer escort, used by the Polish Navy during World War II. Initially built for the Royal Navy, it bore the name of HMS Silverton during British use.

History
The ship was laid down on 5 December 1939 in the J. Samuel White Shipyard in Cowes. On 4 December 1940 she was launched as HMS Silverton for the Royal Navy. However on 3 April 1941 it was agreed that she would be allocated (along with ) to the Polish Navy to replace the ex-French destroyer  which was being manned by the Poles. Commissioned on 28 May of that year, she was renamed ORP Krakowiak, after either a folk dance from Kraków or an inhabitant of that city.

As she was the first ship of her class to be handed to the Poles, until 10 July 1941, her crew spent most of their time training and getting to know the ship. After that date she entered line service in the convoy escort role in the North Atlantic. In December of that year she was among the ships to take part in the successful raid against a German naval outpost on the Lofoten islands. Throughout the war she also patrolled the North Sea, often engaging in skirmishes with German torpedo boats. In 1943 she moved to the Mediterranean, where she took part in, among others, Operation Husky, the Allied invasion of Sicily, and later in the Dodecanese Campaign. Altogether, during the Second World War she covered over  escorting 206 different convoys, including nine in the North Atlantic. She shot down three enemy planes, but the number of enemy vessels sunk is unclear.

At the end of the war, she was active in Operation Deadlight (November 1945 – February 1946), in which German U-boats were towed out to an area north-west of Ireland to be scuttled.

Postwar
After the Allied powers withdrew their support for the Polish government, the ship was decommissioned on 28 September 1946 by the Polish Navy and returned to the British, who re-commissioned her under her original name and placed her in reserve at Devonport. She was reclassified as a frigate and given a new number: F 55. Serving in only rare cases, she spent most of her time in dock, preserved as part of the Reserve Fleet. As such she represented the Reserve Fleet during Queen Elizabeth II's coronation celebrations in Spithead in July 1953. In 1959 she was finally decommissioned and sold to Thos. W. Ward for scrapping, arriving at Grays, Essex, in March of that year.

References

Publications

External links

 ORP Krakowiak at uboat.net

 

Hunt-class destroyers of the Royal Navy
Ships built on the Isle of Wight
1940 ships
World War II destroyers of the United Kingdom
Hunt-class destroyers of the Polish Navy
World War II destroyers of Poland
Operation Overlord
Cold War frigates of the United Kingdom